Biabeh (also Romanized as Bīābeh; also known as Bīābehzir) is a village in Miankuh-e Moguyi Rural District, in the Central District of Kuhrang County, Chaharmahal and Bakhtiari Province, Iran. At the 2006 census, its population was 62, in 10 families. The village is populated by Lurs.

Gallery

References 

Populated places in Kuhrang County
Luri settlements in Chaharmahal and Bakhtiari Province